Edward Dunne may refer to:

Edward Fitzsimmons Dunne, Mayor of Chicago and Governor of Illinois
Edward Joseph Dunne, Bishop of Dallas
Edward Marten Dunne, British army officer and MP

See also
Edward Dunn (disambiguation)